The 1983 Women's Davies & Tate British Open Squash Championships was held at the Assembly Rooms in Derby from 6–14 April 1983. The event was won for the fourth consecutive year by Vicki Cardwell (née Hoffman) who defeated Lisa Opie in a repeat of the 1982 final. Vicki Cardwell made the shock announcement that she was going to retire after the 1983 World Open. The Australian was serving a two-year team events ban in her home country following misconduct in the 1981 Women's World Open Squash Championship.

Draw and results

First round

Second round

Third round

Quarter-finals

Semi-finals

Final

References

Women's British Open Squash Championships
Squash in England
Women's British Open Squash Championship
Sport in Derby
Women's British Open Squash Championship, 1983
Women's British Open Squash Championship
British Open Squash Championship
Women's British Open Squash Championship